Guillermo Durán and Máximo González were the defending champions, but Durán did not participate this year. González defended his title alongside Flavio Cipolla, beating Andreas Beck and Peter Gojowczyk 6–4, 6–1.

Seeds

Draw

External links
 Main Draw

Distal and ITR Group Tennis Cup - Doubles
2015 Doubles